size2shoes is the début music album by Irish band size2shoes. The album was recorded and mixed by Smalltone artist Kieran Lynch (U2, Elvis Costello, Declan O'Rourke, Iarla Ó Lionáird), and was recorded at Dromore Studios in County Tipperary in Ireland. The album was also mastered at the Windmill Lane studios in Dublin.

Track listing
 Take It Easy
 Sitting by the Sea
 Respect The Man
 Mirage
 Light In The Dark
 Size2shoes
 Sleeptight
 Snooze
 Proud
 The Parting Glass

Personnel
 Produced by eyemusic and size2shoes
 Recorded by Kevin Lynch
 Mastered by Tim Martin at Windmill Lane
 size2shoes - Vocals, Guitars, Piano
 Double Bass/Electric Bass - David Duffy
 Alto sax/clarinet - Kenneth Edge
 Harmonica - Brendan Power
 Percussion - Noel Eccles
 Strings Quartet - The Carolan String Quartet
Lynda O'Connor (violin)
Aoileann Ní Dhúill (violin)
Aoife Nic Athlaoich (cello)
Karen Dervan (viola)

References

External links
 size2shoes music – official page with lyrics and credits

2009 albums
Size2shoes albums